Nabiabad may refer to:
Nabiabad, Khuzestan
Nabiabad, Kurdistan
Nabiabad, Lorestan
Nabiabad, Mazandaran
Nabiabad, Sistan and Baluchestan
Nabiabad, West Azerbaijan